Saint Eormenhild (or Ermenilda, Ermenildis, Ermengild, all meaning "battle-great", from eormen- "great", hild- "battle") (died about 700/703) is a 7th-century Anglo-Saxon saint venerated in the Eastern Orthodox and Roman Catholic churches.

Life
She features in the genealogies of various 11th and 12th century versions of the Kentish Royal Legend. These describe her as the daughter of King Eorcenberht of Kent and St. Seaxburh of Ely, and wife to Wulfhere of Mercia, with whom she had a daughter, St. Wærburh, and a son, Coenred. Eormenhild became a nun after her husband died in 675, and eventually became abbess of Minster-in-Sheppey and Ely consecutively.

There are almost no contemporary records for her life. When discussing Wulfhere, Bede mentions neither she nor her daughter Wærburh. However, her name is mentioned as an abbess in a (copy of a) charter of King Wihtred of Kent, dated 699, along with three other abbesses present at the occasion when the charter was issued: "Irminburga, Aeaba et Nerienda".

Her feast day is 13 February.

References

Primary sources
Charter of King Wihtred, Sawyer no. 20 (AD 699)
The Kentish Royal Legend, also known as Þá hálgan (Cambridge, CCC, MS 201,), ed. Felix Liebermann, Die Heiligen Englands. Hanover, 1889. 1–10. Edition transcribed by Alaric Hall.
Kentish Royal Legend / Þá hálgan (London, Lambeth Palace 427, f. 211), transcribed by Alaric Hall
Anonymous Old English Life of St. Mildrith (Caligula), ed. and tr. Oswald Cockayne, Leechdoms, Wortcunning, and Starcraft of Early England, vol. 3. London, 1866. 422-9 (Caligula), 428-32 (MS Lambeth Palace). Caligula text partially transcribed by Alaric Hall and Cockayne's volume available as PDF from Google Books.
Goscelin, Vita Deo delectae virginis Mildrethae, 11th century. Published in Latin, in Rollason, D, (1982) The Mildrith Legend, Leicester University Press.
Charter of King Cnut, Sawyer no. 958 (AD 1022), possibly a forgery.
Goscelin, Lectiones in natale S. Eormenhilde, ed. and tr. Rosalind C. Love, Goscelin of Saint-Bertin. The Hagiography of the Female Saints of Ely. OMT. Oxford, 2004. 11 ff.
Liber Eliensis, ed. E.O. Blake, Liber Eliensis. Camden Society 3.92. London, 1962; tr. J. Fairweather. Liber Eliensis. A History of the Isle of Ely from the Seventh Century to the Twelfth. Woodbridge, 2005.

External links

Ermenilda at Patron Saints Index
Ermenilda at Catholic Online
Saint ERMENILDA
Saint of the Day, February 13 at SaintPatrickDC.org

7th-century births
Year of birth unknown

700s deaths
Year of death uncertain
7th-century Christian saints
7th-century English people
Abbesses of Ely
Anglo-Saxon royal consorts
Kentish saints
7th-century English women
House of Kent
Female saints of medieval England
People from Minster, Swale